Mauritius Renninger (8 June 1905 – 22 December 1987) was a German theoretical physicist noted for his work on crystallography and x-ray optics. He's known for the Renninger effect and for the Renninger negative-result experiment.

See also
Renninger negative-result experiment
Mott problem

References

1905 births
1987 deaths
20th-century German physicists